"You're Gone" is a song written by Paul Williams and Jon Vezner, and recorded by American country music group Diamond Rio.  It was released in June 1998 as the lead-off single from their album Unbelievable. It peaked at number 4 in the United States and number 5 in Canada, in the Country charts of both territories.

Content
According to co-writer Paul Williams, the song came about when he and Vezner were discussing the death of one of Williams' old friends, Tom Jans, as well as other people who influenced their lives.

Critical reception
Larry Flick from Billboard wrote, "Jon Vezner and Paul Williams have written a song that grabs the listeners by the ears immediately with the opening lines "I said hello I think I'm broken/And though I was only jokin'/It took me by surprise when you agreed/I was trying to be clever/For the life of me I never/Would have guessed how far the simple truth would lead." This is an incredible song, and Diamond Rio lead vocalist Marty Roe delivers the powerful poetry in a voice that perfectly conveys the complex emotions in the lyric. The production by the talented Mike Clute and the Rio boys is clean and uncluttered, letting the vocal and piano drive home the impact of the lyric. This is just the first single from a great new album that shows these guys plan to hang on to that Country Music Assn. vocal group trophy they recaptured last fall."

Music video
The music video for the song was directed by Peter Zavadil, and premiered in mid-1998.

Charts

Weekly charts

Year-end charts

References

1998 singles
Diamond Rio songs
Songs written by Paul Williams (songwriter)
Music videos directed by Peter Zavadil
Arista Nashville singles
1998 songs
Songs written by Jon Vezner